Yuki Bhambri was the defending champion but chose not to defend his title.

Elias Ymer won the title after defeating Prajnesh Gunneswaran 6–2, 7–5 in the final.

Seeds

Draw

Finals

Top half

Bottom half

References
Main Draw
Qualifying Draw

KPIT MSLTA Challenger - Singles
2018 Singles